Yuriy Alexandrovich Kuzmenkov (16 February 1941 – 11 September 2011) was a Soviet-Russian screen and stage actor. He was known for portraying working class and military people. He was awarded the Honored Artist of Russia (1980).

Early life 

Kuzmenkov was born and grew up in Moscow. He came from a working-class family. His father was a metal worker and his mother was a hairdresser.

Upon graduating high school, Kuzmenkov went to trade school to become a metal lathe operator. He got work in a factory but found that he enjoyed acting and took part in amateur performances at his workplace. As his passion for acting increased, he went to study at the school-studio of Yuri Zavadsky at the Mossovet Theatre.

Career 
After graduation in 1964, he stayed on at the Mossovet as a member of the acting troupe.

Kuzmenkov made his screen debut in 1963 in the Soviet film In the Name of the Revolution. He rose to fame in 1970, with movies such as Taymyr Calls You (1970) and Big School-Break (1972).

Personal life 
He married theatre actress Galina Vanuyshkina in 1963. Their son, Stepan, is a diplomat.

He died from a heart attack on 11 September 2011.

Partial filmography 

1965: Our House
1966: Dni lyotnye - Andrey
1967: Zhurnalist
1970: U ozera - Passazhir poezda
1971: Minuta molchaniya - starshina Kostya Bokarev
1972: Boy posle pobedy - mayor Lapin
1973: Lyubit cheloveka
1973: Vysokoe zvanie. Dilogiya: Film pervyy. Ya - Shapovalov T.P. - Zampolit
1973: Big School-Break - Fedoskin
1974: Kazhdyy den zhizni - Grisha
1974: Osen
1974: Potomu chto lyublyu - Anatoliy Zhuk
1974: Glavnyy den - Boris Pozdyakov
1975: V ozhidanii chuda - Lieutenant
1977: Dodumalsya, pozdravlyayu - Moryak-poputchik
1977: Ognennoye detstvo - kommissar Sabbutin
1977: 100 gramm dlya khrabrosti - Vasya
1977: Nesovershennoletnie
1978: Po semeynym obstoyatelstvam - Vodoprovodchik
1981: Lyubov moya vechnaya
1981: Krupnyy razgovor
1981: Chestnyy, umnyy, nezhenatyy...
1983: Inspektor GAI - Slava
1985: Pobeda - Gvozdikov
1987: Muzhskiye portrety
1988: Ozhog
1990: Sheremetevo-2
1991: Yar
1991: Poka grom ne gryanet
1991: Okhota na sutenyora
1992: Plashchanitsa Aleksandra Nevskogo
1995: What a Mess! - Man with a goat
2003: Antikiller 2: Antiterror
2011: BAgI - Lunin (final film role)

References

External links
 
 Yuriy Kuzmenkov at the Mossovet Theatre

1941 births
2011 deaths
Male actors from Moscow
Russian male film actors
Russian male stage actors
Honored Artists of the Russian Federation
Soviet male film actors
Soviet male stage actors